Keyni Sayeh (also Romanized as Keynī Sāyeh) is a village in Kolyai Rural District, in the Central District of Asadabad County, Hamadan Province, Iran. At the 2006 census, its population was 413, in 103 families.

References 

Populated places in Asadabad County